The Ayrshire Miners' Union was a coal mining trade union based in Scotland.

History
The first Ayrshire Miners' Union was founded in 1880, with Keir Hardie as its organiser.  The union supported a strike for higher wages over the winter of 1881/82, but this was unsuccessful, and the union dissolved.

A new union was founded in 1886, with its Hardie elected as its first secretary.  In 1893, it was reorganised on a federal basis and renamed the Ayrshire Miners' Federal Union.  It was a founder of the Scottish Miners' Federation (SMF) in 1894, and by 1897 it claimed 3,000 members out of a total workforce of 10,000 in the county, making it the third-largest component of the federation.

In 1944, the SMF became the unitary National Union of Scottish Mineworkers, and the union became its Ayrshire District, with less autonomy than before.

Secretaries
1886: Keir Hardie
1889: Peter Muir
1908: James Brown
1939: Alexander Sloan

Presidents
1886: John Bank
1894: James Brown
1908: Robert Smith
1934: James Mullen

References

Mining trade unions
National Union of Mineworkers (Great Britain)
1886 establishments in Scotland
Mining in Scotland
Defunct trade unions of Scotland
Trade unions established in 1886